The 1956–57 Scottish League Cup was the 11th season of Scotland's second football knockout competition. The competition was won by Celtic, who defeated Partick Thistle in the Final.

First round

Group 1

Group 2

Group 3

Group 4

Group 5

Group 6

Group 7

Group 8

Group 9

Supplementary Round

First Leg

Second Leg

Quarter-finals

First Leg

Second Leg

Semi-finals

Ties

Replay

Final

Replay

References

General

Specific 

1956–57 in Scottish football
Scottish League Cup seasons